Lirimiris is a genus of moths of the family Notodontidae erected by Francis Walker in 1865.

Species
Lirimiris albolineata Druce, 1887
Lirimiris auriflua Draudt, 1937
Lirimiris guatemalensis Rothschild, 1917
Lirimiris lignitecta Walker, 1865
Lirimiris meridionalis (Schaus, 1904)
Lirimiris truncata (Herrich-Schäffer, [1856])

References

Notodontidae